Caecilia abitaguae is a species of caecilian in the family Caeciliidae. It is endemic to Ecuador. Its natural habitats are subtropical or tropical moist montane forests, plantations, rural gardens, and heavily degraded former forest. It is threatened by habitat loss.

References

abitaguae
Amphibians of Ecuador
Amphibians described in 1942
Taxonomy articles created by Polbot